Per Axel Lundgren, credited as P.A. Lundgren, (1911–2002) was a Swedish art director active in Swedish cinema from the 1940s to 1980s. He is known in particular for his collaborations with the film director Ingmar Bergman.

Selected filmography

 We Need Each Other (1944)
 The Girl and the Devil (1944)
 My People Are Not Yours (1944)
 It Rains on Our Love (1946)
 When the Meadows Blossom (1946)
 Life in the Finnish Woods (1947)
 Lars Hård (1948)
 Carnival Evening (1948)
 Foreign Harbour (1948)
 Bohus Battalion (1949)
 The Street (1949)
 Son of the Sea (1949)
 Vagabond Blacksmiths (1949)
 Big Lasse of Delsbo (1949)
 The Devil and the Smalander (1949)
 When Love Came to the Village (1950)
 The Motor Cavaliers (1950)
 The Realm of the Rye (1950)
 Stronger Than the Law (1951)
 A Ghost on Holiday (1951)
 In the Arms of the Sea (1951)
 In Lilac Time (1952)
 Kalle Karlsson of Jularbo (1952)
 Summer with Monika (1953)
 The Glass Mountain (1953)
 No Man's Woman (1953)
 Hidden in the Fog (1953)
 A Lesson in Love (1954)
 Sir Arne's Treasure (1954)
 Wild Birds (1955)
 The Light from Lund (1955)
 Uncle's (1955)
 Violence (1955)
 The Unicorn (1955)
 The Biscuit (1956)
 The Hard Game (1956)
Seventh Heaven (1956)
 The Song of the Scarlet Flower (1956)
 The Seventh Seal (1957)
 Night Light (1957)
 The Halo Is Slipping (1957)
 More Than a Match for the Navy (1958)
 The Great Amateur (1958)
 The Jazz Boy (1958)
 The Magician (1958)
 Playing on the Rainbow (1958)
 A Goat in the Garden (1958)
 Only a Waiter (1959)
 Heaven and Pancake (1959)
 Swinging at the Castle (1959)
 Crime in Paradise (1959)
 On a Bench in a Park (1960)
 Nightmare (1965)
 Woman of Darkness (1966)
 The Vicious Circle (1967)
 A Handful of Love (1974)
 City of My Dreams (1976)

References

Bibliography
 Orr, John. The Demons of Modernity: Ingmar Bergman and European Cinema. Berghahn Books, 2014 
 Stephens, Michael L. Art Directors in Cinema: A Worldwide Biographical Dictionary. McFarland, 1998.

External links

1911 births
2002 deaths
Swedish art directors